In Greek mythology, Stentor (Ancient Greek: Στέντωρ; gen.: Στέντορος) was a herald of the Greek forces during the Trojan War.

Mythology 
Stentor is mentioned briefly in Homer's Iliad in which Hera in the guise of Stentor, whose "voice was as powerful as fifty voices of other men"  encourages the Greeks to fight.  

Elsewhere, Stentor is said to have died after losing a shouting contest with Hermes.

Stentor's story is the origin of the term "stentorian", meaning loud-voiced, for which he was famous. Aristotle uses the concept in his Politics Book 7, Chapter IV saying, "For who can be the general of such a vast multitude, or who the herald, unless he have the voice of a Stentor?"

See also
List of Trojan War characters

Notes

References 

 Homer, The Iliad with an English Translation by A.T. Murray, Ph.D. in two volumes. Cambridge, MA., Harvard University Press; London, William Heinemann, Ltd. 1924. . Online version at the Perseus Digital Library.
 Homer, Homeri Opera in five volumes. Oxford, Oxford University Press. 1920. . Greek text available at the Perseus Digital Library.

Achaeans (Homer)